Elections to Sheffield City Council were held on 4 May 1990. One third of the council was up for election.

Election result

|- style="background-color:#F9F9F9"
! style="background-color: " |
| No Poll Tax
| align="right" | 0
| align="right" | 0
| align="right" | 0
| align="right" | 0
| align="right" | 0.0
| align="right" | 0.0
| align="right" | 96
| align="right" | N/A
|-

|- style="background-color:#F9F9F9"
! style="background-color: " |
| International Communist
| align="right" | 0
| align="right" | 0
| align="right" | 0
| align="right" | 0
| align="right" | 0.0
| align="right" | 0.0
| align="right" | 56
| align="right" | N/A
|-

This result had the following consequences for the total number of seats on the Council after the elections:

Ward results

Mukesh Savani was a sitting councillor for Heeley ward

|- style="background-color:#F9F9F9"
! style="background-color: " |
| International Communist
| Michael England
| align="right" | 56
| align="right" | 1.3
| align="right" | +1.3
|-

James Steinke was a sitting councillor for Netherthorpe ward

|- style="background-color:#F9F9F9"
! style="background-color: " |
| No Poll Tax
| Simon Rawlins
| align="right" | 96
| align="right" | 1.7
| align="right" | +1.7
|-

References

1990 English local elections
1990
1990s in Sheffield